Yang Dong (600s–619), known in traditional histories by his princely title of Prince of Yue (越王) or by his era name as Lord Huangtai (皇泰主), posthumous name (as bestowed by Wang Shichong) Emperor Gong (恭皇帝), courtesy name Renjin (仁謹), was an emperor of the Chinese Sui dynasty.  During the disturbances that permeated throughout the Sui state late in the dynasty's history, his grandfather Emperor Yang left him in charge of the eastern capital Luoyang, and after Emperor Yang was killed by the general Yuwen Huaji in 618, the Sui officials in Luoyang declared Yang Dong emperor.  However, soon one of those officials, Wang Shichong, seized power, and in 619 had Yang Dong yield the throne to him, ending Sui.  Soon, he was killed on Wang's orders.

During Emperor Yang's reign 
It was not recorded when Yang Dong was born, except that his elder brother Yang Tan (楊倓) was born in 603 and his younger brother Yang You was born in 605.  He was the second of three sons of Yang Zhao, Emperor Yang's son and crown prince.  His mother was Yang Zhao's concubine, Consort Liu.

In 606, Yang Zhao died.  According to Confucian principles of succession, Yang Dong's younger brother Yang You, would have been considered Yang Zhao's heir and successor, as Yang You was born of Yang Zhao's wife Crown Princess Wei.  However, Emperor Yang did not create any son of Yang Zhao crown prince to replace Yang Zhao, but left the matters of succession ambiguous between them and Yang Zhao's younger brother Yang Jian the Prince of Qi.  He did, however, create Yang Dong and his brothers imperial princes, and Yang Dong was created the Prince of Yue.

In spring 613, when Emperor Yang launched his second of three campaigns against Goguryeo, he left the eight-year-old Yang Dong nominally in charge of the eastern capital Luoyang, with the official Fan Zigai actually responsible.  Subsequently, while Emperor Yang was in Goguryeo territory, the general Yang Xuangan rebelled near Luoyang, and Fan defended Luoyang under Yang Dong's command.  The general Wei Wensheng, leading the army from the capital Chang'an under Yang You's command, came to Luoyang's aid, and Emperor Yang also abandoned the Goguryeo campaign and sent the generals Yuwen Shu and Lai Hu'er back to the Luoyang region; these Sui generals together defeated Yang Xuangan.

In 616, with most of Sui territory, particularly the northern commanderies, engulfed in agrarian rebellions, Emperor Yang went from Luoyang to Jiangdu (江都, in modern Yangzhou, Jiangsu), leaving Yang Dong in charge of Luoyang assisted by the officials Duan Da, Yuan Wendu, Wei Jin, Huangfu Wuyi, and Lu Chu. The rebel leaders Li Mi and Zhai Rang soon took advantage of Emperor Yang's departure (along with the elite Xiaoguo Army, to capture the food storages Luokou Storage and Huiluo Storage, near Luoyang, causing Luoyang to be down on food supplies.  In spring 617, Yang Dong sent the generals Liu Changgong and Pei Renji against Li Mi and Zhai, but Liu and Pei were defeated.  In summer 617, with his forces repeatedly defeated by Li Mi's, Yang Dong sent the official Yuan Shanda to Jiangdu to seek aid from Emperor Yang, but Emperor Yang, believing in the prime minister Yu Shiji's assessments that the situation was not as severe as Yuan Shanda was claiming, initially refused to send aid.  Pei soon surrendered to Li Mi, making Luoyang's position even more precarious.  Emperor Yang finally did order the generals Pang Yu and Huo Shiju to lead the troops from the Chang'an region to aid Luoyang, and Pang and Huo were able to force Li Mi away from Huiluo, allowing Luoyang to regain some of its food supply, although by fall 617 Li Mi had recaptured Huiluo.

In fall 617, Emperor Yang sent the general Wang Shichong (from Jiangdu) and several generals in other outlying areas to lead their troops to aid Luoyang.  Wang was able to stem Li Mi's advances, and the armies stalemated.  Meanwhile, the general Li Yuan had rebelled at Taiyuan and soon captured Chang'an, declaring Yang Dong's brother Yang You emperor (as Emperor Gong).  In spring 618, Li Yuan sent his sons Li Jiancheng and Li Shimin to lead an army to Luoyang, ostensibly to aid it, but Yang Dong and his officials chose to have no communications at all with Li Jiancheng and Li Shimin.  After Li Jiancheng and Li Shimin briefly engaged Li Mi, they considered the idea of attacking Luoyang but did not do so, and instead withdrew to Chang'an.

In late spring 618, Emperor Yang was killed in a coup led by the general Yuwen Huaji, who declared Emperor Yang's nephew Yang Hao the Prince of Qin emperor, and began to lead the Xiaoguo Army on a trek back north.  Soon, news of Emperor Yang's death arrived at Chang'an and Luoyang.  Li Yuan, in response, had Yang You yield the throne to him, establishing Tang dynasty as its Emperor Gaozu.  The officials at Luoyang declared Yang Dong emperor, and those commanderies still loyal to Sui recognized him as emperor as well.

Reign 

When describing Yang Dong's brief reign, the official histories indicated that Yang Dong had a handsome face, and was meek, loving, and solemn in his personality.

Yang Dong posthumously honored his father Yang Zhao as an emperor, and honored his mother Consort Liu as empress dowager.  The government was led by a collective leadership of seven officials—Duan Da (whom Yang Dong created the Duke of Chen), Wang Shichong (Duke of Zheng), Yuan Wendu (Duke of Lu), Huangfu Wuyi (Duke of Qi), Lu Chu, Guo Wenyi, and Zhao Changwen.  They became known as the "seven nobles."

Meanwhile, the officials at Luoyang, fearful that Yuwen Huaji was approaching Luoyang, contemplated their options.  Yuan and Lu, under suggestion from Gai Cong, decided to try to make peace with Li Mi by bestowing official Sui honors—including creating him the Duke of Wei, a title that Li Mi himself had claimed.  Li Mi, who was apprehensive of Yuwen's advances himself, accepted.  For the next month, Li Mi and Yuwen battled, and each time Li Mi was victorious over Yuwen, he would report to Yang Dong.  The officials at Luoyang were pleased, except for Wang, who remarked that Yuan and Lu were awarding honors on a bandit, drawing suspicions from Yuan and Lu that Wang was intending to surrender the city to Yuwen.  The "seven nobles" thereafter became to suspect each other.

Wang began to incite his troops by telling them that they would soon fall into Li Mi's trap, and that if Li Mi received the command over them (as Li Mi was nominally bestowed the office of supreme commander of the armed forces), he would surely slaughter them for having resisted him.  When Yuan received news that Wang was doing this, he planned to ambush Wang.  However, Duan revealed the plot to Wang, and Wang started a coup himself first, killing Lu and surrounding the palace.  Huangfu fled to Chang'an (controlled by the Tang).  At Wang's insistence, Yang Dong surrendered Yuan, who remarked to Yang Dong, "If I die in the morning, Your Imperial Majesty will die in the evening."  Yang Dong wept, but still sent Yuan to Wang, who executed Yuan.  Wang then met Yang Dong and pledged his loyalty, swearing that all he intended was to save himself and save the empire.  Yang Dong took Wang inside the palace to meet Empress Dowager Liu, and Wang swore before her as well.  Nevertheless, from this point, all power was in Wang's hands, and Yang Dong himself was powerless.

Upon hearing of Yuan and Lu's deaths, Li Mi broke off the peaceful relations with Yang Dong's regime, now under Wang's control.  However, he had a low opinion of Wang, so he did not take much precaution against an attack from Wang.  In fall 618, Wang made an all-out attack against Li Mi, dealing Li Mi a crushing defeat at the Battle of Yanshi.  Li briefly considered fleeing to his general Xu Shiji, but ultimately decided to head west to Chang'an, to surrender to Tang.  Most of Li Mi's former territory (modern central and eastern Henan) surrendered to Wang, and around the same time, the rebel generals Du Fuwei (who controlled modern central and southern Anhui), Shen Faxing (who controlled modern Zhejiang), Zhu Can (whose army roamed in southern Henan), and Dou Jiande (who controlled modern Hebei), all nominally submitted to Yang Dong, and at least in appearance, it appeared that Sui power was becoming restored under Yang Dong.

Meanwhile, Wang was becoming arrogant in his relations with Yang Dong and Empress Dowager Wang.  Once, after attending a feast in the palace, he became afflicted with food poisoning, and he became convinced that there was poison in his food, and from that point on refused to see Yang Dong any more.  Yang Dong knew that Wang was intent on usurping the throne, but could not think of anything to do other than to try to receive divine favor by donating palace silk to the poor—an action that Wang soon put a stop to by surrounding the palace.  By spring 619, Wang had Yang Dong make him the Prince of Zheng and bestow on him the nine bestowments – the ultimate steps before taking the throne.  In summer 619, Wang had Duan and Yun Dingxing enter the palace to try to persuade Yang Dong to yield the throne, but Yang Dong refused.  Wang then sent a messenger to Yang Dong, promising that although he was taking the throne, he would return the throne to Yang Dong once Yang Dong grew older. He thereafter issued an edict in Yang Dong's name, yielding the throne to himself, ending Sui. Wang took the throne as the emperor of a new state of Zheng.

After reign 
Wang Shichong made Yang Dong the Duke of Lu.  A month later, Pei Renji and his son Pei Xingyan, as well as the officials Yuwen Rutong, Yuwen Wen (宇文溫, Yuwen Rutong's brother), and Cui Deben plotted to kill Wang and restore Yang Dong.  The news leaked, and the conspirators were slaughtered, along with their families.

Wang Shichong's brother Wang Shiyun the Prince of Qi persuaded Wang Shichong that in order to avoid a repeat of the plot, he needed to put Yang Dong to death.  Wang Shichong agreed, and he sent his nephew Wang Renze the Prince of Tang and his servant Liang Bainian to force Yang Dong to drink poison.  Yang Dong made one last plea, pointing out that Wang Shichong had previously promised to keep him alive.  Liang considered requesting confirmation from Wang Shichong, but Wang Shiyun refused.  Yang Dong set sacrifices to Buddha and prayed, "May it be that I will no longer again be reborn into an imperial household."  He drank poison, but initially did not die.  Wang Shiyun ordered that he be strangled.  Wang Shichong posthumously honored Yang Dong as "Emperor Gong", the same posthumous name that Tang later gave Yang Dong's brother Yang You, but as Sui's official history, the Book of Sui was written during Tang, Yang You was recognized as Emperor Gong, while Yang Dong's status as a Sui emperor became ambiguous in traditional histories.

Notes and references 

 Book of Sui,vol. 59 .
 History of Northern Dynasties, vol. 71.
 Zizhi Tongjian, vols. 180, 182, 183, 184, 185, 186, 187.

|- style="text-align: center;"

|-

|-

|-

|- style="text-align: center;"

Sui dynasty emperors
600s births
619 deaths
Sui dynasty Buddhists
Chinese Buddhist monarchs
7th-century Chinese monarchs
Political office-holders in Henan
Executed people from Shaanxi
Executed monarchs
Forced suicides of Chinese people
People executed by strangulation
People executed by China
7th-century executions
Transition from Sui to Tang